The Women's 100 metre backstroke S9 event at the 2020 Paralympic Games took place on 30 August 2021, at the Tokyo Aquatics Centre.

Final

References

Swimming at the 2020 Summer Paralympics
2021 in women's swimming